Conklin's Atlas of the Worlds and Handy Manual of Useful Information is a 1989 role-playing game supplement for Space: 1889 published by Game Designers' Workshop.

Contents
Conklin's Atlas of the Worlds is a supplement which includes expanded maps of Mars and Venus, and a section on Mercury.

Publication history
Conklin's Atlas of the Worlds and Handy Manual of Useful Information was written by Frank Chadwick, with a cover by Shea Ryan and illustrations by Tim Bradstreet and Angela Bostick, and was published by Game Designers' Workshop in 1989 as an 80-page book.

Reception
Paul Mason reviewed Conklin's Atlas of the Worlds for Games International magazine, and gave it 3 stars out of 5, and stated that "Conklin's is far better than Tales from the Ether, and is well worth getting if you are running a Space: 1889 campaign. However, I still feel that the game is too much facts, and not enough flair."

References

Role-playing game supplements introduced in 1989
Science fiction role-playing game supplements
Space: 1889